Marco Sejna (born 20 March 1972 in West Berlin) is a German former professional footballer as a goalkeeper.

References

External links 
 

1972 births
Living people
Footballers from Berlin
German footballers
Association football goalkeepers
Bundesliga players
2. Bundesliga players
3. Liga players
Hertha BSC players
Hertha BSC II players
Tennis Borussia Berlin players
FC Sachsen Leipzig players
Rot Weiss Ahlen players
Rot-Weiss Essen players
1. FC Union Berlin players
SV Yeşilyurt players
FC Ingolstadt 04 players
FC Ingolstadt 04 II players